The Roman Catholic Diocese of Banfora is a diocese located in the city of Banfora in the Ecclesiastical province of Bobo-Dioulasso in Burkina Faso.

History
On June 27, 1998, it was established as the diocese of Banfora from territory of the diocese of Bobo-Dioulasso.

On January 19, 2021, Rodrigue Sanon, a priest of the diocese, vanished on his way to meet with bishop Lucas Sanou. The bishops of Burkina Faso have denounced violence by Muslim extremist militias.

Special churches
The cathedral is the Cathédrale Saint-Pierre in Banfora.

Leadership
 Bishops of Banfora (Latin Church)
 Lucas Kalfa Sanou (since June 27, 1998)

See also
 Roman Catholicism in Burkina Faso

References

External links
 GCatholic.org

Banfora
Christian organizations established in 1998
Roman Catholic dioceses and prelatures established in the 20th century
Banfora, Roman Catholic Diocese of
1998 establishments in Burkina Faso